Aleksandr Galkin may refer to:

 Aleksandr Galkin (footballer) (born 1948), Russian football coach and former football player
 Aleksandr Galkin (chess player) (born 1979), Russian chess player and grandmaster
 Aleksandr Galkin (general) (born 1958), Russian military officer